Kartsev is a Russian masculine surname, its feminine counterpart is Kartseva. Notable people with the surname include:

Aleksandr Kartsev (born 2001), Russian artistic gymnast
Denis Kartsev, Russian ice hockey winger
Vasili Kartsev (1920–1987), Russian football player

Russian-language surnames